Flip It Like Disick was an American reality television series that aired on the E! cable network. The series debuted on August 4, 2019, and consisted of eight episodes. It followed Scott Disick and his team as they renovated luxury homes in the greater Los Angeles area. Disick's team is made up of his best friend and business partner Benny Luciano, realtor Kozet Luciano (Benny's wife), Disick's assistant Lindsay Diamond, contractor Miki Mor, and pop-singer and interior designer Willa Ford. The first season had numerous guest stars, including Steve Aoki, Kris Jenner, and Sofia Richie. Originally, the show was titled Royally Flipped.

In Season One, Disick and his team attempt to purchase and renovate the Jed Smith House. The completely renovated house was initially listed for more than double the price for which they purchased it. As of April 2020, the house had not sold. Purchased for $3.235 million in April 2018 by Disick and his team, the house finally sold for $5.6 million in November 2020.

Episodes

References

External links

2010s American reality television series
2019 American television series debuts
English-language television shows
Television series by Ryan Seacrest Productions
Keeping Up with the Kardashians
American television spin-offs
Reality television spin-offs
E! original programming